Colleville-sur-Mer is an abandoned World War II military airfield, which is located near the commune of Carentan in  the Normandy region of northern France.

Located just outside La Fontaine, the United States Army Air Forces established a temporary airfield shortly after D-Day on 8 June 1944, shortly after the Allied landings in France  The airfield was one of the first established in the liberated area of Normandy, being constructed by the IX Engineering Command, 832d Engineer Aviation Battalion.

History

References

External links

World War II airfields in France
Airfields of the United States Army Air Forces in France
Airports established in 1944